Linda Thomas may refer to:

 Lynda Thomas (born 1981), Mexican musician, singer and songwriter
 Linda Craig Thomas, American politician and former member of the Washington House of Representatives
 Linda Lee Thomas (1883–1954), American socialite and wife of Cole Porter